Nectoliparis pelagicus, the tadpole snailfish, is a species of snailfish native to the north Pacific Ocean where it can be found at depths down to  (though more commonly down to ).  This species grows to a length of  SL.  This species is the only known member of its genus.

References

Liparidae
Monotypic fish genera
Fish described in 1912